In the mathematical field of category theory, FinVect is the category whose objects are all finite-dimensional vector spaces and whose morphisms are all linear maps between them.

Properties 
FinVect has two monoidal products:

 the direct sum of vector spaces, which is both a categorical product and a coproduct,
 the tensor product, which makes FinVect a compact closed category.

Examples 
Tensor networks are string diagrams interpreted in FinVect.

Group representations are functors from groups, seen as one-object categories, into FinVect.

DisCoCat models are monoidal functors from a pregroup grammar to FinVect.

See also 
 FinSet
 ZX-calculus
 category of modules

References 

Categories in category theory
Dimension